Dhanmondi is a residential and commercial area in Dhaka, Bangladesh, known for its central location, cultural vibrancy and being home to the country's founder, Sheikh Mujibur Rahman. The origins of Dhanmondi can be traced back to the late 1950s, when the Government of East Pakistan developed it as a centrally planned and residential area to house the city's top bureaucrats.

History

Dhanmondi's origins can be traced back to the 1952, beginning as a residential area for the city, and over the decades evolving into a chic, miniature city, with hospitals to malls, schools, banks, offices and universities. After the liberation war, its neighbourhoods primarily consisted of two-story houses. About 8 years before the establishment of DIT in 1956, the Dhanmondi residential area was planned.

Dhanmondi once had a canal next to it, but it dried up by the 19th century, making the market there less significant. Dhanmondi subsequently became forested and remained that way until the mid-twentieth century. Later, at the end of the Pakistan period, Dhanmondi became one of several residential areas for the elite and the wealthy. Many commercial establishments have since rapidly developed in some areas of Dhanmondi. 

The founding father of Bangladesh, Sheikh Mujibur Rahman, once lived here. He was assassinated along with most of his family at his residence in Dhanmondi road no. 32 in 15th August, 1975. His residence has since become a memorial museum. Many other notable people also live here.

Geography

Dhanmondi is located in the heart of Dhaka District of Bangladesh.

Features
The most important roads in Dhanmondi are Road no. 27, Satmasjid Road and Mirpur Road.

Dhanmondi lake 

The lakeside walkway at Dhanmondi Lake is overlooked by the Rabindra Sharabar, an open-air amphitheater near the Road 8 bridge, where dramas, concerts, and various cultural programs are held from time to time by both amateur and professional artistes, especially during major festivals and holidays.

Exotic and delicious snack stalls along the lakeside, particularly on Road 2 (opposite the entrance to Bangladesh Rifles), Road 5 (on an island accessible only by foot bridges from two sides), Road 8 (near the amphitheater) and Road 32 (opposite the residence of Sheikh Mujibur Rahman), offer a variety of snacks and beverages, aimed at city dwellers during the day. These places are gathered by a lot of people, mostly around late afternoon, due to its popularity.

During festivals such as Pohela Baishakh, Independence Day and Eid, moving around Dhanmondi can be difficult due to crowding.

Banks
Almost every bank operating in the country has an outlet in Dhanmondi. Foreign banks such as Citi, HSBC and Standard Chartered also have branches there, with HSBC and Standard Chartered having multiple ATM booths within the area.

Restaurants
Dhanmondi is known for its wide range of expensive restaurants and cafes that mostly cluster around Satmasjid Road. Several local and international fast food chains in the country have outlets in this area.

Dhanmondi is home to many renowned food chains, especially fast food. International chains include KFC, Pizza Hut, Burger King, Domino's Pizza, Chatime, Second Cup, Gloria Jean's Coffees, Coffee World, A&W, Pizza Inn, Secret Recipe, Mövenpick, Baskin-Robbins, New Zealand Natural, The Coffee Bean & Tea Leaf, CP, Herfy, Tony Roma's and ChicKing.

Etymology
Dhanmondi, today's residential area, was cultivated during the British period. But at that time there were some settlements in Dhanmondi. It was named Dhanmandi because paddy was produced in that area. The area used to house rice and other grain seed markets. Bazaar is called Mandi in Persian and Urdu. From there the area was named Dhanmondi.

Education

Over the last fifteen years, a large number of outstanding schools, colleges and private universities have been developed around the area.

Government Laboratory High School, BCSIR School, Birshreshtha Noor Mohammad Public School, Birshreshtha Munshi Abdur Rouf Public School,  Viqarunnisa Noon School, YWCA Higher Secondary School etc are some of the renowned schools in this area. Many well-known English medium schools in the country, such as Scholastica (Junior Section), South Breeze, Sunbeams, Oxford International School Main Campus and Junior Dhanmondi Campus, Mastermind, Maple Leaf International school, Marie Curie School, Dhanmondi Tutorial, Sunnydale, European Standard School (ESS), Scholars School and College are located here.

Colleges like Dhaka College,  Hamdard Public College, Ideal College and  Dhaka City College are located here. Among the universities, University Of Development Alternative (UODA), International Islamic University Chittagong, the University of Liberal Arts Bangladesh, United International University, Daffodil International University, Eastern University, People's University of Bangladesh, World University of Bangladesh, Stamford University, University of Asia Pacific are the most well-known and can be quite luxurious and expensive.

Real estate
Real estate in Dhanmondi has seen prices rise over the last 20 years.

There are new houses that are getting built every year. Companies like BTI, Shanta, Rangs, Concord and others are coming up with new ventures every year. 

The prices of these apartments are on average Tk 15000 per sqft. Although sometimes it can be higher or lower depending on the area.  

Houses are going for rent at quite an expensive rate. This is mainly because Dhanmondi is surrounded by decent schools, hospitals and offices.

Gallery

See also
Gulshan Thana
Thanas of Bangladesh
Upazilas of Bangladesh
 Districts of Bangladesh
 Divisions of Bangladesh
 Old Dhaka

References

 
Thanas of Dhaka
Planned cities in Bangladesh